Mindfulness-based stress reduction (MBSR) is an eight-week evidence-based program that offers secular, intensive mindfulness training to assist people with stress, anxiety, depression and pain. Developed at the University of Massachusetts Medical Center in the 1970s by Professor Jon Kabat-Zinn, MBSR uses a combination of mindfulness meditation, body awareness, yoga and exploration of patterns of behaviour, thinking, feeling and action. Mindfulness can be understood as the non-judgmental acceptance and investigation of present experience, including body sensations, internal mental states, thoughts, emotions, impulses and memories, in order to reduce suffering or distress and to increase well-being. Mindfulness meditation is a method by which attention skills are cultivated, emotional regulation is developed, and rumination and worry are significantly reduced. During the past decades, mindfulness meditation has been the subject of more controlled clinical research, which suggests its potential beneficial effects for mental health, as well as physical health. While MBSR has its roots in Buddhist wisdom teachings, the program itself is secular. The MBSR program is described in detail in Kabat-Zinn's 1990 book Full Catastrophe Living.

History 

In 1979, Jon Kabat-Zinn founded the Mindfulness Based Stress Reduction Clinic at the University of Massachusetts Medical Center, and nearly twenty years later the Center for Mindfulness in Medicine, Health Care and Society at the University of Massachusetts Medical School. Both these institutions supported the growth and implementation of MBSR into hospitals worldwide. Kabat-Zinn described the MBSR program in detail in his bestselling 1990 book Full Catastrophe Living, which was reissued in a revised edition in 2013. In 1993, the MBSR course taught by Jon Kabat-Zinn was featured in Bill Moyer's Healing from Within. In the year 2015, close to 80% of medical schools are reported to offer some element of mindfulness training, and research and education centers dedicated to mindfulness have proliferated.

Program

A meta-analysis described MBSR as "a group program that focuses upon the progressive acquisition of mindful awareness, of mindfulness". The MBSR program is an eight-week workshop taught by certified trainers that entails weekly group meetings (2.5 hour classes) and a one-day retreat (seven-hour mindfulness practice) between sessions six and seven, homework (45 minutes daily), and instruction in three formal techniques: mindfulness meditation, body scanning and simple yoga postures. Group discussions and exploration - of experience of the meditation practice and its application to life - is a central part of the program.  Body scanning is the first prolonged formal mindfulness technique taught during the first four weeks of the course, and entails quietly sitting or lying  and systematically focusing one's attention on various regions of the body, starting with the toes and moving up slowly to the top of the head.
MBSR is based on non-judging, non-striving, acceptance, letting go, beginners mind, patience, trust, and non-centering.

According to Kabat-Zinn, the basis of MBSR is mindfulness, which he defined as "moment-to-moment, non-judgmental awareness."  During the program, participants are asked to focus on informal practice as well by incorporating mindfulness into their daily routines. Focusing on the present is thought to heighten sensitivity to the environment and one’s own reactions to it, consequently enhancing self-management and coping. It also provides an outlet from ruminating on the past or worrying about the future, breaking the cycle of these maladaptive cognitive processes. The validity and reliability of a weekly single-item practice quality assessment have been confirmed by research. Increases in practice quality predicted improvements in self-report mindfulness and psychological symptoms but not behavioral mindfulness, and longer practice sessions were linked to better practice quality.

Scientific evidence of the debilitating effects of stress on human body and its evolutionary origins were pinpointed by the work of Robert Sapolsky, and explored for lay readers in the book Why Zebras Don't Get Ulcers. Engaging in mindfulness meditation brings about significant reductions in psychological stress, and appears to prevent the associated physiological changes and biological clinical manifestations that happen as a result of psychological stress. According to early neuroimaging studies, MBSR training has an influence on the areas of the brain responsible for attention, introspection, and emotional processing.

Extent of practice 

According to a 2014 article in Time magazine, mindfulness meditation is becoming popular among people who would not normally consider meditation.  The curriculum started by Kabat-Zinn at University of Massachusetts Medical Center has produced nearly 1,000 certified MBSR instructors who are in nearly every state in the US and more than 30 countries.  Corporations such as General Mills have made MBSR instruction available to their employees or set aside rooms for meditation. Democratic Congressman Tim Ryan published a book in 2012 titled A Mindful Nation and he has helped organize regular group meditation periods on Capitol Hill.

Methods of practice 

Mindfulness-based stress reduction classes and programs are offered by various facilities including hospitals, retreat centers, and various yoga facilities. Typically the programs focus on teaching
 mind and body awareness to reduce the physiological effects of stress, pain or illness
 experiential exploration of experiences of stress and distress to develop less emotional reactivity
 equanimity in the face of change and loss that is natural to any human life
 non-judgmental awareness in daily life
 promote serenity and clarity in each moment
 to experience more joyful life and access inner resources for healing and stress management
 mindfulness meditation

Evaluation of effectiveness 
Mindfulness-based approaches have been found to be beneficial for healthy adults for adolescents and children, healthcare professionals, as well as for different health-related outcomes including eating disorders, psychiatric conditions, pain management  sleep disorders, cancer care, psychological distress, and for coping with health-related conditions. As a major subject of increasing research interest, 52 papers were published in 2003, rising to 477 by 2012. Nearly 100 randomized controlled trials had been published by early 2014.

The development of therapies to improve individuals' flexibility in switching between using and not using emotion regulation (ER) methods is necessary because it is linked to better mental health, wellbeing, and resilience. According to research, those who attended MBSR training exhibited greater regulatory decision flexibility. In post-secondary students, research on mindfulness-based stress reduction has demonstrated that it can reduce psychological distress, which is common in this age range. In one study, the long-term impact of an 8-week Mindfulness-Based Stress Reduction (MBSR) treatment extended to two months after the intervention was completed. 

Individuals with eating disorders have benefited from the mindfulness-based approach. MBSR therapy has been found to assist individuals improve the way they view their bodies. Interventions, such as mindfulness-based approaches, which focus on effective coping skills and improving one’s relationship with themselves through increased self-compassion can positively impact a person’s body image and contribute to overall well-being.

Research suggests mindfulness training improves focus, attention, and ability to work under stress. Mindfulness may also have potential benefits for cardiovascular health. Evidence suggests efficacy of mindfulness meditation in the treatment of substance use disorders. Mindfulness training may also be beneficial for people with fibromyalgia.

In addition, recent research has explored the ability of mindfulness-based stress reduction to increase self-compassion and enhance the well-being of those who are caregivers, specifically mothers, for youth struggling with substance use disorders. Mindfulness-based interventions allowed for the mothers to experience a decrease in stress as well as a better relationship with themselves which resulted in improved interpersonal relationships.

It has been demonstrated that mindfulness-based stress reduction has beneficial impacts on healthy individuals as well as suffering individuals and those close to suffering individuals. Roca et al. (2019) conducted an 8-week mindfulness-based stress reduction program for healthy participants. Five pillars of MBSR, including mindfulness, compassion, psychological well-being, psychological distress, and emotional-cognitive control were identified. Participants psychological functioning were examined and assessed using questionnaires. Mindfulness and overall well-being was significant between the five pillars observed.

Mindfulness-based interventions and their impact have become prevalent in every-day life, especially when rooted in an academic setting. After interviewing children, of the average age of 11, it was apparent that mindfulness had contributed to their ability to regulate their emotions. In addition to these findings, these children expressed that the more mindfulness was incorporated by their school and teachers, the easier it was to apply its principles.

Mindfulness-based stress approaches have been shown to increase self-compassion. Higher levels of self-compassion have been found to greatly reduce stress.  In addition, as self-compassion increases it seems as though self-awareness increases as well. This finding has been observed to occur during treatment as well as a result at the conclusion, and even after, treatment. Self-compassion is both a result and an informative factor of the effectiveness of mindfulness-based approaches.

MBIs (mindfulness-based intervations)  showed a positive effect on mental and somatic health in social when compared to other active treatments in adults. This effects may be gender dependent. However, the effects seemed independent of duration and compliance with these kind of intervention.

See also
 Full Catastrophe Living
 Buddhism and psychology
 Buddhist meditation
 Metacognition
 Mindfulness (journal)
 Mindfulness and technology
 Mindful yoga
 Self-compassion
 Yoga as therapy
Mindfulness-based pain management
Mindfulness-based cognitive therapy

References

External links
 Center For Mindfulness (CFM) at University of Massachusetts, where MBSR began
 Not-for-profit Mindfulness Training Institute (Teacher Training in MBSR/CT)
 Coping with stress (Reducing Stress with Mindfulness)

Meditation
Alternative medicine
Mindfulness (psychology)
1979 introductions